Voisava ( at least 1402–05) was the wife of Gjon Kastrioti, a Albanian nobleman from the House of Kastrioti. They had nine children together, one of which was Albanian national hero Gjergj Kastrioti, better known as Skanderbeg.

Early life 
Voisava is mentioned for the first time by Albanian authors Marin Barleti and Gjon Muzaka about ~70–80 years after her death. Both authors lived in the immediate generation after Skanderbeg's death. It is uncertain if her actual name was Voisava. A notary act from the archives of the Republic of Ragusa which dates to July 10, 1439, names the widow of Gjon Kastrioti as Jella. However, both Barleti and Muzaka referred to her as Voisava.

Both mention as the Polog area. This is likely a reference to the Polog valley, North Macedonia. It has also been argued that another Polog, closer to the town of Bitola in the plain of Pelagonia may be the location of the Polog mentioned by Barleti.

Origin 
Many modern sources explain that Voisava was of South Slavic descent. The other view is her originating from Albanian Muzaka family. A biography on her son, mentions her as the daughter of a "Triballian nobleman", which is interpreted as her being Serbian, modern scholars pointing to the Branković dynasty. While this is the most supported theory, this interpretation is still debatable since there is no mention of her name in the Brankovic family tree.

Family
Voisava married Gjon Kastrioti, the "Lord of a part of Albania" (dominus partium Albanie). She bore 9 children with Gjon, 4 sons and 5 daughters:

Reposh ( 1426–d. 1431), monk, buried at a monastery.
Stanisha (fl. 1426–d. 1445), commander.
Konstandin (fl. 1426), 
Mara, married Stefan Crnojević, Lord of Zeta (r. 1451–65)
Skanderbeg (Gjergj Kastrioti, 1405–1468), Albanian magnate and general; Ottoman subaşi of Krujë, sanjakbey of Dibra, later organizer of the League of Lezhë, and Neapolitan vassal as of 1451
Jelena (or Jela), married Pavle Balšić with whom she had, according to Noli, three sons.
Mamica, married Muzak Thopia in 1445
Angelina, married Vladan Arianiti, brother of Gjergj Arianiti.
Vlajka, married Gjin Muzaki, secondly Stefan Strez Balšić with whom she possibly had sons Ivan and Gojko.

Voisava carried a Slavic name. Her name derives from the name Vojislav, composed of two elements: “voj” (war, warrior) and “sláva” (glory, fame, honor). Therefore, the name means “one who wins fame in the wars, famous warrior”.

Early sources
The earliest works mentioning Voisava are:
Marin Barleti, the Albanian-Venetian historian, wrote in his biography of Skanderbeg (published between 1508 and 1510), that her "father was a Triballian nobleman" (pater nobilissimus Triballorum princeps). In another chapter, when talking about the inhabitants of Upper Debar that defended Svetigrad, he calls them "Bulgarians or Triballi" (Bulgari sive Tribali habitant). The term "Triballians" (Triballoi) was used in Byzantine works as an exonym for Serbs.
Gjon Muzaka, a member of the Albanian Muzaka family in Italy, mentioned her in his chronicle (published in 1515) as Voisava Tripalda, "who was of a noble family". Furthermore, in another chapter, Muzaka explains that "Tribali" is another name for Serbs.  According to William Miller, and Johann Georg von Hahn, the surname (Tripalda) added by Muzaka is a corruption, a derivative from Barleti's quote on the Triballi. In another passage, it is alleged that the "Marquis of Tripalda" was maternally related to the Muzaka, which has led to Fan Noli and Harry Hodgkinson theorizing that Voisava was a Muzaka (see next section).

In historiography
Johann Georg von Hahn (1811-1869), an Austrian expert in Albanian studies, had several theses on the genealogy of Albanian noble families in Albanesische Studien (1854). In Reise durch die Gebiete von Drin und Wardar (1867/69), he theorized that if one of Vrana Konti's descendants held the title "Marchese di Tripalda", that Vrana and Voisava Tripalda were related by blood.
Karl Hopf (1832–1873), a German historian and expert in Byzantine studies, in Chroniques Greco-romanes (1873) concluded that Voisava was daughter of a Serbian lord from Polog.
William Miller (1864-1945), an English medievalist, said the following, in his review of Athanase Gegaj's work which claimed that Skanderbeg was purely Albanian: "...Skanderbeg's mother had a Slav name, and the epithet 'Tripalda' given to her is a corruption of the tribal name 'Triballi', which the pedantic Byzantine historians applied to the Serbs. Moreover, if he had no connexion with Serbia, why should he have given two villages to Chilindar ... the famous Serbian monastery on Mount Athos, immemorially connected with Serbian kings, medieval and modern?".
In Bulgarian historiography, historian-medievalist Vasil Zlatarski (1866-1935), mentioned her as the daughter of a Serbian nobleman. Historian Strashimir Dimitrov (1892–1960) said that she was a daughter of a local Bulgarian lord (boyar) from Macedonia.
Fan S. Noli, an Albanian-American writer, in his biography of Skanderbeg (1947), adopted the view that Vojsava came from the Muzaka family. British writer and Balkans expert Harry Hodgkinson (1913–1994) considered her a member of the Muzaka family as well. Oliver Schmitt rejected this view and stated that Hodgkinson had done no archival research.
Boban Petrovski, a Macedonian historian and author of Voisava Tribalda (2006), the only work about Voisava and her possible genealogies, concluded that Voisava was of undoubtedly Slavic origin, most likely Serb, as she was the daughter of a lord of the "Triballians" (Serbs) in Polog, that had ruled before the Ottoman conquest. He had several theses on the ultimate identity of Voisava's father: "If the Branković family indeed governed Polog in the last decade of the 14th century, it arises the chance that Voisava was a daughter of Grgur Branković or even Vuk Branković."
Oliver Schmitt, a professor of South-East European history at Vienna University, in his biography Skanderbeg: Der neue Alexander auf dem Balkan (2009) supported that she was a Serbian noblewoman of the Branković family and sister to Mara Branković.
Robert Elsie (born 1950), an Albanologist, mentioned her as "a Slavic woman ... related to the noble Serbian Brankovići family".
Medievalist Tadeusz Wasilewski notes that Voisava is not listed as a member of the Brankovic dynasty family tree.
Boško Bojović, a medievalist with a research focus on the relations of the Kastrioti family to Mount Athos (Hilandar) considers her a member of the Muzaka family.

Annotations

References

Sources

 Dominicus alias Moncinus [genuit]: 1. Agnese Andre Angeli mater, & 2. Voisava Ivani uxorem. (Karl Hopf: Chroniques gréco-romanes inédites ou peu connues, Berlin, p. 308). Uxor is Latin for "wife, spouse".

15th-century Albanian people
House of Kastrioti
15th-century births
15th-century deaths